SS Clan Macalister was a Clan Line heavy-lift cargo liner. She was launched in 1930 in Scotland and sunk by enemy aircraft during the Dunkirk evacuation in 1940 with the loss of 18 of her crew. She was the largest ship to take part in the Dunkirk evacuation.

She was the third Clan Line ship to be called Clan Macalister. The first was a steamship built in 1891 and sold to Furness, Withy in 1902. The second was a steamship built in 1903 and sunk by a U-boat in 1915.

Details
Clan Macalister was a sister ship of Clan Macdonald, which was launched in 1928, and Clan Macdougall and Clan Macpherson, which were launched in 1929. Clan Line had all four ships built by the Greenock Dockyard Company, which it owned.

Clan Macalister was launched on 29 January 1930 and completing her that April.

Whereas Clan Macdonald and Clan Macdougall were motor ships, for Clan Macpherson and Clan Macalister Clan Line reverted to a triple-expansion engine linked to a Bauer-Wach low-pressure exhaust steam turbine. The turbine drove the same shaft as her piston engine by double-reduction gearing and a Föttinger fluid coupling. The combined power of her piston engine and turbine was 719 NHP.

John G. Kincaid & Company of Greenock built Clan Macalisters triple-expansion engine. William Beardmore and Company of Glasgow made her Bauer-Wach turbine. On 8 May 1930 she passed her sea trials. On her speed trial she achieved . She was handed over to her owners the same day.

At least one of Clan Macalisters derricks could lift 50 tons.

Clan Macalisters UK official number was 161909. Her code letters were LFVP until 1933–34, when they were superseded by the call sign GQYP.

Loss
The UK Government requisitioned Clan Macalister on 28 September 1939.

On 27 May 1940 Clan Macalister was in Southampton when the Admiralty requisitioned her to assist the evacuation of UK and Allied forces from Dunkirk. With her heavy-lift derricks she loaded eight landing craft and sailed for Dunkirk.

Two were damaged while being unloaded, but the other six began evacuating troops.

At 1545 hrs three bombs dropped by German aircraft hit the ship, and a fire broke out in her number 5 hold. The destroyer  rescued her troops and wounded members of Clan Macalisters crew, and tried to fight the fire. The minesweeper  rescued the remainder of Clan Macalisters crew, including her Master, RW Mackie.

18 of Clan Macalisters crew were killed.

References

Bibliography

1930 ships
Maritime incidents in May 1940
Ships built on the River Clyde
Ships of the Clan Line
Ships sunk by German aircraft
Steamships of the United Kingdom
World War II merchant ships of the United Kingdom
World War II shipwrecks in the North Sea